Eva Persaki ( is a Greek painter. She was born in Paris and was raised in an artistic environment as she was the daughter of the painter Gianna Persaki and the Hungarian French sculptor László Szabó. Her stepfather was the Greek sculptor Costas Koulentianos and she was a student of painter Panos Sarafianos.

Eva Persaki studied literature at the University of Sorbonne and graduated from the Greek Fine Arts School first as a student of the painter George Mavroidis and then of Kostas Xinopoulos professor of Vyzantine Hagiography. During her studies she was granted of a two-year scholarship from the Greek government.

While in Paris, she did lessons with Hayter who was Pablo's Picasso teacher in engraving and then she also studied at the Academy of Grande Chaumiere. In 1978, under a scholarship of the Indian Embassy she went to Benares to study miniatures and following she studied Tibetan Painting lessons Tang-ka, in Nepal for three years.

Her work is mainly diversified in portraits, landscapes and hagiography and can be recognised  from the vibrant colours. 
Paintings are located in Paris, United States, England, Italy, Japan, Switzerland, Ireland, Greece and in private collections including Collection Cagellari in Athens.

She is a founding member of the Picturial Association in Syros island and lives and works between Athens, Syros and London.

Group exhibitions 

2013 Syros Open Art Studios 
 
2012 Municipal Art Gallery, Piraeus

2011 Scala Shop, Mykonos
 
2011 Art Centre, Vasilisis Sofias, Athens
 
2008 Gallery Cafe, Athens
 
2008 Culture Organisation Athens Town
 
2007 Milo Gallery, Athens
 
2007 Aenaon Gallery, Athens
 
2006 Centre of Arts and Human Rights, Athens
 
2005 Centre of Arts and Human Rights, Athens
 
2002 Gallery Skoufa, Athens
 
2001, Apothiki Gallery, Syros
 
1994 Epipeda Gallery, Athens
 
1993 Epipeda Gallery, Athens
 
1986 "Women Artists", Sillogi Gallery, Athens
 
1985 Art Organization of Greece, Athens
 
1977 Luxembourg Museum, Paris
 
1975 Library Plethron

Individual exhibitions 

2010 Ermoupoleia 2010, Syros 
 
2008 Ermoupoleia 2008, Syros
 
2007 Milo Gallery, Athens
 
2007 Pontoporos Gallery, Paros
 
2006 Pontoporos Gallery, Paros
 
2007 Christina Karela Gallery, Athens
 
2007 Cosmos Gallery, Hermoupolis, Syros
 
2005 Art Gallery Lavyrinth, Katerini
 
2003 Ermoupoleia 2003, Syros
 
1998 Culture Organisation, Athens Townhall
 
1997 Aenaon Gallery (Bulgarian Embassy)
 
1994 Epipeda Gallery, Athens
 
1990 Cultural Centre, Syros
 
1988 Loulaki Gallery, Hydra
 
1985 Artistic Centre Ora, Athens

References

Date of birth missing (living people)
Year of birth missing (living people)
Living people
21st-century French women artists
21st-century Greek women artists
Artists from Paris
University of Paris alumni
Portrait artists